The Secretary for the Civil Service is the head of the Civil Service Bureau in Hong Kong. Unlike other secretaries for bureaux, the Secretary for the Civil Service is filled by an administrative officer from the civil service, who may choose to return to the civil service when his term expires. Before Principal Officials Accountability System was introduced in 2002, it was a civil service position.

List of office holders

Colonial period, 1973–1997

After handover, 1997–present 
Political party:

References

External links
Principal Officials of the Hong Kong SAR government
Chapter IV: Political Structure - Basic Law
Who's Who

Civil Service, Secretary for